Balcarce may refer to:

People
Antonio González de Balcarce (1774–1819), Argentine military commander
Juan Ramón Balcarce (1773–1836), Argentine military leader and politician
Marcos González de Balcarce (1777–1832), Argentine military commander and politician

Places
Balcarce, Buenos Aires Province, a city in Argentina
Balcarce Partido, the district surrounding the town of Balcarce

See also
Actinopus balcarce, a species of mygalomorph spiders in the Actinopodidae family
Sportivo Balcarce, Argentine sports club